Tillandsia ionantha, the air plant, is a species of plant in the genus Tillandsia. This species is native to Central America and Mexico. It is also reportedly naturalized in Broward County, Florida.

Description
They are acaulescent or sometimes shortly caulescent plants, with a size of 6–8 cm high. The leaves 4–9 cm long; with pods 0.6–1 cm wide, densely patent fabric; narrow triangular sheets, 0.3-0.4 cm wide, dense lepidota indument, foliaceous bracts; compound inflorescence (of simple appearance due to the reduction of the spikes to 1 flower), with 1-3 flowers, primary foliaceous bracts, much longer than the spikes, floral bracts 3 cm long, longer than the sepals and covering them in the anthesis, ecarinated, inconspicuously nervate, glabrous, membranous, sessile flowers; sepals are 2 cm long, free, the posterior carinate, the anterior ecarinated; purple petals. Capsules are 2.5-4.5 cm long.

Taxonomy
Tillandsia ionantha was described by Jules Emile Planchon and published in Flore des Serres et des Jardins de l'Europe 10: 101, t. 1006. 1854-1855 [1855].

Etymology
Tillandsia: generic name that was named by Carl Linnaeus in 1738 in honor of the Finnish doctor and botanist Elias Tillandz (originally Tillander ) (1640-1693).
ionantha: epithet Latin meaning "with violet flowers"

Synonymy
Tillandsia ionantha f. fastigiata P.Koide
Tillandsia ionantha var. Max Ehlers
Tillandsia ionantha var. LBSmith scaposa
Tillandsia ionantha var. P.Koide stricta
Tillandsia ionantha var. van-hyningii MBFoster
Tillandsia ionantha var. zebrina BTFoster
Tillandsia rubentifolia Poisson & Menet
Tillandsia scopus Hook. F. 4

Varieties
Two varieties are recognized:

Tillandsia ionantha var. ionantha - most of species range
Tillandsia ionantha var. stricta Koide - Oaxaca

Gallery

References

ionantha
Flora of Costa Rica
Flora of Mexico